GLS University is a private university located in Ahmedabad, Gujarat, India. The university was established in 2015 by the Gujarat Law Society (GLS) through The Gujarat Private Universities (Amendment) Act, 2015.

References

External links

Universities in Ahmedabad
Educational institutions established in 2015
2015 establishments in Gujarat
Private universities in India